Greensboro Municipal Airport  is a city-owned public-use airport located three nautical miles (4 mi, 6 km) southwest of the central business district of Greensboro, a city in Hale County, Alabama, United States.

This airport is included in the FAA's National Plan of Integrated Airport Systems for 2011–2015 and 2009–2013, both of which categorized it as a general aviation facility.

Facilities and aircraft 
Greensboro Municipal Airport covers an area of 23 acres (9 ha) at an elevation of 180 feet (55 m) above mean sea level. It has one runway designated 18/36 with an asphalt surface measuring 3,495 by 78 feet (1,065 x 24 m).

For the 12-month period ending November 7, 2007, the airport had 2,088 general aviation aircraft operations, an average of 174 per month. At that time there were 9 aircraft based at this airport: 67% single-engine and 33% multi-engine.

See also 
 List of airports in Alabama

References

External links 
 Aerial image as of 25 January 1992 from USGS The National Map

Airports in Alabama
Transportation buildings and structures in Hale County, Alabama